The 1939 North Carolina Tar Heels football team represented the University of North Carolina at Chapel Hill during the 1939 college football season. The Tar Heels were led by fourth-year head coach Raymond Wolf and played their home games at Kenan Memorial Stadium. They competed as a member of the Southern Conference.

Paul Severin was named a first-team All-American end by the Associated Press, and a second-team All-American by the NEA.

Schedule

References

North Carolina
North Carolina Tar Heels football seasons
North Carolina Tar Heels football